Charlesfjellet is a mountain in Prins Karls Forland, Svalbard that is 969 m.a.s.l. tall and located on Grampianfjella. In 1910, it was used as a trigonometric station.

References

Mountains of Prins Karls Forland